The Gebze Metro is an under-construction rapid transit system in Gebze and Darıca, Turkey. The line will interchange with TCDD Taşımacılık high-speed and intercity trains along with Marmaray commuter trains to Istanbul at Gebze railway station. The metro system will be the first network to exist outside of a provincial capital in Turkey, as Gebze and Darıca are located within the Kocaeli Province.

Most of the metro line will be underground, except for a  section which will be at-grade. Journey time is expected to be 19 minutes and the projected daily ridership is expected to 4,800. A maintenance facility and a control center will be constructed at Pelitli, in north Gebze. Construction began in late 2018, and is expected to open in 2023.

See also
 List of metro systems

References

Standard gauge railways in Turkey
Buildings and structures under construction in Turkey
Rapid transit in Turkey